Lana Gogoberidze (born October 13, 1928, Tbilisi) is a Georgian film director and politician.

Educated at Tbilisi State University and Moscow State University of Cinematography, Gogoberidze headed Director's Studio at the Rustaveli Theatre School, Tbilisi, in 1975. She was elected to the Parliament of Georgia from 1992 to 1995. In 2004, she served as Georgia's Ambassador to France.

Gogoberidze's fiction and documentary movies have won several international awards. Her film Day Is Longer Than Night was entered into the 1984 Cannes Film Festival. In the same year, she was a member of the jury at the 34th Berlin International Film Festival.

Gogoberidze was married beginning in 1958 to the architect Vladimir Aleksi-Meskhishvili (died 1978), with two daughters.

References

External links
 

1928 births
Living people
Film people from Tbilisi
Women film directors from Georgia (country)
Film directors from Georgia (country)
Members of the Parliament of Georgia
Ambassadors of Georgia (country) to France
21st-century women politicians from Georgia (country)
21st-century politicians from Georgia (country)
Women diplomats from Georgia (country)
Tbilisi State University alumni
20th-century women politicians from Georgia (country)
20th-century politicians from Georgia (country)
Women ambassadors from Georgia (country)
Diplomats from Tbilisi
Politicians from Tbilisi